Maikoti is a village situated  from its district headquarters of Rudraprayag, in Rudraprayag district, Uttarakhand, India. Haryali devi temple is a notable religious site located in maikoti village. Along with the religious places it its well known for its natural beauty. Natural resources  and traditional lifestyle is the beauty of this village. Maikoti has higher literacy rate compared to the uttrakhand . As per government official in 2011 the literacy rate of Maikoti village was 84.19%. As per constitution of India and Panchyati Raaj Act, Maikoti village is administrated by Sarpanch (Head of Village) who is elected representative of village. Maikoti village, located in the Rudraprayag district of Uttarakhand, is a hidden gem that boasts of breathtaking natural beauty and rich cultural heritage. The village is surrounded by lush green forests and snow-capped mountains, making it a perfect destination for nature lovers and adventure enthusiasts.

Maikoti village is a traditional village that is well known for its simple way of life and traditional customs. The villagers here still follow the age-old traditions and celebrate various festivals with great zeal and enthusiasm. The village is also famous for its unique architecture, which reflects the culture and traditions of the region. The houses in the village are built using locally available materials like stone and wood, and are designed in such a way that they blend in perfectly with the natural surroundings.

Tourist Spots 
From the point of view of tourists, it is worth it to visit here and its beauty never disappoint you . The village is situated on the way to Kartik-swami .The village have padmavati temple, Haryali devi temple and much more eye catching beauty. while visiting here one can feel the peace and can see the eye-catching beauty. Also the place not yet reached to the tourist but one can visit here while travelling to kedarnath beacause it is on the way to kedarnath dham.In conclusion, Maikoti village is a perfect destination for those who are looking to escape the hustle and bustle of city life and experience the beauty and serenity of nature. The village offers a unique blend of traditional culture, natural beauty, and adventure activities, making it a must-visit destination for all.

One of the most popular attractions in Maikoti village is the ancient temple of Goddess Durga, known as the Haryali devi Temple. This temple is considered to be one of the most sacred and important places of worship in the region and attracts a large number of devotees and tourists every year. The temple is surrounded by beautiful gardens and is a perfect place to meditate and soak in the peaceful atmosphere.

Villages in Rudraprayag district